The 1998 Champion Hurdle was a horse race held at Cheltenham Racecourse on Tuesday 17 March 1998. It was the 69th running of the Champion Hurdle.

The winner was J. P. McManus's Istabraq, a six-year-old gelding trained in Ireland by Aidan O'Brien and ridden by Charlie Swan.

Istabraq started the 3/1 favourite and won by twelve lengths from his stable companion Theatreworld, who had finished second to Make A Stand in the previous year, with I'm Supposin in third place. There were no previous Champion Hurdlers in the field but the other runners included Pridwell, Relkeel and Dato Star. The strongly-fancied Shadow Leader was fatally injured in a fall at the final hurdle. Fifteen of the eighteen runners completed the course.

Race details
 Sponsor: Smurfit
 Purse: £231,800; First prize: £137,420
 Going: Good
 Distance: 2 miles 110 yards
 Number of runners: 18
 Winner's time: 3m 49.10

Full result

 Abbreviations: nse = nose; nk = neck; hd = head; dist = distance; UR = unseated rider; PU = pulled up; LFT = left at start; SU = slipped up; BD = brought down

Winner's details
Further details of the winner, Istabraq
 Sex: Gelding
 Foaled: 23 May 1992
 Country: Ireland
 Sire: Sadler's Wells; Dam: Betty's Secret (Secretariat)
 Owner: J. P. McManus
 Breeder: Shadwell Stud

References

Champion Hurdle
 1998
Champion Hurdle
Champion Hurdle
1990s in Gloucestershire